The Ob constituency (No.181) is a Russian legislative constituency in Tomsk Oblast. During 1993-1995 the constituency covered upstate Tomsk Oblast but Tomsk Oblast lost its second constituency prior to the 1995 election, so both Rural and Urban constituencies were merged into Tomsk constituency. Tomsk Oblast regained its second constituency in 2016 and currently Ob constituency covers parts of Tomsk as well as western Tomsk Oblast.

Members elected

Election results

1993

|-
! colspan=2 style="background-color:#E9E9E9;text-align:left;vertical-align:top;" |Candidate
! style="background-color:#E9E9E9;text-align:left;vertical-align:top;" |Party
! style="background-color:#E9E9E9;text-align:right;" |Votes
! style="background-color:#E9E9E9;text-align:right;" |%
|-
|style="background-color:#0085BE"|
|align=left|Stepan Sulakshin
|align=left|Choice of Russia
|
|25.59%
|-
|style="background-color:"|
|align=left|Sergey Zhvachkin
|align=left|Independent
|
|18.76%
|-
|style="background-color:"|
|align=left|Grigory Shamin
|align=left|Independent
|
|14.05%
|-
|style="background-color:"|
|align=left|Vladimir Makarov
|align=left|Independent
|
|10.87%
|-
|style="background-color:"|
|align=left|Yury Krasnov
|align=left|Independent
|
|5.41%
|-
|style="background-color:"|
|align=left|Mikhail Arpishkin
|align=left|Independent
|
|3.40%
|-
|style="background-color:#000000"|
|colspan=2 |against all
|
|15.19%
|-
| colspan="5" style="background-color:#E9E9E9;"|
|- style="font-weight:bold"
| colspan="3" style="text-align:left;" | Total
| 
| 100%
|-
| colspan="5" style="background-color:#E9E9E9;"|
|- style="font-weight:bold"
| colspan="4" |Source:
|
|}

2016

|-
! colspan=2 style="background-color:#E9E9E9;text-align:left;vertical-align:top;" |Candidate
! style="background-color:#E9E9E9;text-align:leftt;vertical-align:top;" |Party
! style="background-color:#E9E9E9;text-align:right;" |Votes
! style="background-color:#E9E9E9;text-align:right;" |%
|-
| style="background-color: " |
|align=left|Tatyana Solomatina
|align=left|United Russia
|
|42.50%
|-
|style="background-color:"|
|align=left|Natalya Baryshnikova
|align=left|Communist Party
|
|13.90%
|-
|style="background-color:"|
|align=left|Sergey Bryansky
|align=left|Liberal Democratic Party
|
|13.08%
|-
|style="background:"| 
|align=left|Galina Nemtseva
|align=left|A Just Russia
|
|12.74%
|-
|style="background:"| 
|align=left|Vasily Shipilov
|align=left|Communists of Russia
|
|3.51%
|-
|style="background:"| 
|align=left|Mikhail Larin
|align=left|Patriots of Russia
|
|3.38%
|-
|style="background-color:"|
|align=left|Pyotr Chernogrivov
|align=left|The Greens
|
|2.83%
|-
|style="background:"| 
|align=left|Maksim Luchshev
|align=left|Party of Growth
|
|2.59%
|-
| colspan="5" style="background-color:#E9E9E9;"|
|- style="font-weight:bold"
| colspan="3" style="text-align:left;" | Total
| 
| 100%
|-
| colspan="5" style="background-color:#E9E9E9;"|
|- style="font-weight:bold"
| colspan="4" |Source:
|
|}

2021

|-
! colspan=2 style="background-color:#E9E9E9;text-align:left;vertical-align:top;" |Candidate
! style="background-color:#E9E9E9;text-align:left;vertical-align:top;" |Party
! style="background-color:#E9E9E9;text-align:right;" |Votes
! style="background-color:#E9E9E9;text-align:right;" |%
|-
| style="background-color: " |
|align=left|Tatyana Solomatina (incumbent)
|align=left|United Russia
|
|30.68%
|-
|style="background:"| 
|align=left|Galina Nemtseva
|align=left|A Just Russia — For Truth
|
|19.78%
|-
|style="background-color:"|
|align=left|Sergey Guba
|align=left|Communist Party
|
|17.64%
|-
|style="background-color:"|
|align=left|Danil Dorofeyev
|align=left|Liberal Democratic Party
|
|8.37%
|-
|style="background-color: "|
|align=left|Ksenia Starikova
|align=left|New People
|
|8.06%
|-
|style="background-color: "|
|align=left|Larisa Shvetsova
|align=left|Party of Pensioners
|
|6.00%
|-
|style="background-color: " |
|align=left|Igor Lyutayev
|align=left|Yabloko
|
|3.28%
|-
|style="background-color:"|
|align=left|Konstantin Lapshin
|align=left|Rodina
|
|1.42%
|-
| colspan="5" style="background-color:#E9E9E9;"|
|- style="font-weight:bold"
| colspan="3" style="text-align:left;" | Total
| 
| 100%
|-
| colspan="5" style="background-color:#E9E9E9;"|
|- style="font-weight:bold"
| colspan="4" |Source:
|
|}

Notes

References

Russian legislative constituencies
Politics of Tomsk Oblast